John Campbell Colquhoun (23 January 1803 – 17 April 1870) was a Scottish writer and politician.

Life

Colquhoun was born in Edinburgh on 23 January 1803, son of Archibald Colquhoun and Mary Ann, daughter of the Rev. William Erskine, episcopalian minister at Muthill, Perthshire. He was educated at Edinburgh High School, and Oriel College, Oxford.

In 1832 Colquhoun is listed as living at 10 Melville Street in the west end of Edinburgh, then newly built. In the same year he was elected Member of Parliament for Dumbartonshire, and in 1837 for Kilmarnock Burghs. He unsuccessfully contested the Kilmarnock burghs in July 1841, however was elected in July 1842 as a member for Newcastle-under-Lyme, which he continued to represent until the dissolution of 1847, when he retired from reasons of health.

A wealthy Conservative and evangelical, Colquhoun served as president of the Glasgow Society. He was chairman of the general committee of the National Club, the Church of England Education Society, and the Irish Church Mission to Roman Catholics.

Disraeli gave a pen-portrait of him (Reminiscences, ed. H.M. and M. Swartz, 1975, pp. 31–2).

Colquhoun died 17 April 1870 and was buried in Dean Cemetery near Edinburgh.

Works
Colquhoun wrote political and religious pamphlets on questions of the day in Scotland and Ireland. He was also the author of:

Isis Revelata: An Inquiry into the Origin, Progress and Present State of Animal Magnetism, 1836;
Short Sketches of some Notable Lives, 1855; 
Life in Italy and France in the Olden Time, 1858; 
Scattered Leaves of Biography, 1864; 
William Wilberforce, his Friends and his Times, 1866, 2nd edit. 1867; and
Memorials of Henrietta Maria Colquhoun, 1870.

Family
In 1827 Colquhoun married Henrietta Maria, daughter of Thomas Powys, 2nd Baron Lilford. They had two sons.

Notes

Attribution

External links 
  1832–35
  1837–47

1803 births
1870 deaths
Burials at the Dean Cemetery
Members of the Parliament of the United Kingdom for Scottish constituencies
Members of the Parliament of the United Kingdom for Newcastle-under-Lyme
UK MPs 1832–1835
UK MPs 1835–1837
UK MPs 1841–1847
Politicians from Edinburgh
People educated at the Royal High School, Edinburgh
Presidents of the Oxford Union
Alumni of Oriel College, Oxford
Pamphleteers
Writers from Edinburgh
Rectors of the University of Aberdeen